, is a 1958 color Japanese film directed by Koreyoshi Kurahara and produced by Nikkatsu.

Cast 
 Yujiro Ishihara
 Mie Kitahara
 Misako Watanabe
 Nobuo Kaneko
 Jukichi Uno

References

External links 

1958 films
Films directed by Koreyoshi Kurahara
Nikkatsu films
1950s Japanese films